The Badakshan Gold Mine is situated in mountainous terrain in northern Afghanistan in Badakhshan Province, the location benefits from three international borders: Tajikistan to its north, China to its east, and Pakistan to the south.  Badakshan is located 360 km north of Kabul and about 50 km north of the provincial capital city of Fayzabad.

Detailed work was conducted by the joint Soviet/Afghan reconnaissance geological programme in the region in the 1960s.  The work was primarily carried out on the Veka Dur gold prospect, including trench and adit sampling.  Badakshan is the largest and most studied of the known gold-bearing quartz veins systems in the region.  Many of the main drainages for the regions were sampled for placer gold by means of panned concentrates performed in the field. Several mapped areas show alluvial deposits that were trenched, and samples for which panned concentrates were developed and the gold content noted.  Russian C1 + C2 Reserves for both Veka Dur and other quartz veins of 38.7Koz at 4.8g/t based on trench sampling.

It is understood that the national grid will be expanded to Fayzabad in the future.  There is an ample supply of water from the regional watersheds on the project area.

Gold mines
Badakhshan Province